The Autódromo Rosendo Hernández is a motorsports circuit located in San Luis, Argentina. It has hosted events in the TC2000 Championship, Turismo Carretera and Formula Renault Argentina series, as well as the World RX of Argentina of the FIA World Rallycross Championship in 2014. The circuit is close to Potrero de los Funes Circuit, which hosted the FIA GT Championship.

Events

 Former
 FIA World Rallycross Championship World RX of Argentina (2014)
 Top Race V6 (2014)
 Turismo Carretera (2003, 2007–2009, 2011–2016, 2018–2019, 2021–2022)
 Turismo Nacional (2004, 2007, 2011–2019)
 TC2000 Championship (2003–2005, 2007, 2015)

Lap records 

The official race lap records at the Autódromo Ciudad de Paraná are listed as:

References

Motorsport venues in San Luis Province
World Rallycross circuits